Farawand was the name of a royal Daylamite clan roaming in Dakhel, Iran. A member of the clan, Khushkiya ibn Wijka, ruled as King of the Gilites in the early 10th-century.

Sources 
 

History of Gilan
Daylamite clans